King Fahd University of Petroleum and Minerals (KFUPM), after 1975 as the University of Petroleum and Minerals and initially as the College of Petroleum and Minerals, is a nonprofit institution in Dhahran, Saudi Arabia. Among Saudi Arabian universities, its science, engineering, business, and management programs are highly regarded in the country as well as in the whole region.

In 2022, KFUPM was ranked in the 163rd position according the QS World University Rankings, and was ranked the third university in the Arab region.

The university was ranked fourth, by the American National Academy of Inventors, among the top 100 worldwide universities for granting US Utility Patents in 2019, and ranked 14th in 2020. Stanford University has recently released a list of the top 2 percent of the most-cited scientists in various disciplines. The exhaustive list has 186,177 researchers, of which 81 conducted research at KFUPM.

KFUPM is engaged in many research collaborations with world-renowned universities such as MIT, Georgia Tech, Caltech, and Stanford University. It also has partnerships and close ties with key players in the industry and corporations like Saudi Aramco, SABIC, electric and telecommunications companies, local financial institutions, as well as government entities.

History
KFUPM is a premier university in Saudi Arabia, the Middle East, and North Africa regions. KFUPM was established on September 23, 1963, by a Saudi royal decree as the College of Petroleum and Minerals, to provide high-level education in the academic fields of petroleum and minerals, two of the most valuable natural resources in Saudi Arabia.

The first students were admitted on September 23, 1964, when 67 young men enrolled in what was then named the College of Petroleum and Minerals (CPM). The original campus was designed by CRS Design Associates, architects and engineers of Houston, Texas. The college was elevated to university status in 1975 when it expanded its academic offerings in science, engineering, technology, business, and management. In 1984 the Program of Industrial and Systems Engineering was first introduced. The university was renamed after King Fahd in 1986. Since that time, enrollment has grown to over 10,000 students by the 2021 academic year and has graduated more than 39,000 students since its inception.

In 2019 the university put in place a transformation plan whose primary goal is to support the transformation of the Kingdom of Saudi Arabia from a natural resource monetizing economy primarily focused on oil and gas resources, into a diversified knowledge economy, to position the Kingdom as an active participant of the new global digital economy.

Part of this transformation plan presents an important milestone in the history of the university with the inclusion of female students in the engineering and technical academic programs. In 2019 male and female students were equally accepted into new postgraduate programs for the first time in the history of the university, and in 2021 admissions started for female students at the undergraduate level on a merit basis. This step will open the engineering fields for women in the Kingdom and enable their effective participation in all sectors of the new modern economy.

Academics

Academic programs
KFUPM degree offerings include Bachelor of Science, Master of Science, Master of Engineering, Master of Business Administration, and Doctor of Philosophy.

The university's widely renowned academic programs are focused on engineering, sciences, computer sciences, business, management, and are accredited by international bodies such as ABET, AACSB, as well as the national accrediting body NCAAA.

Since 2020 the university has introduced present-day and relevant features in the academic programs through undergraduate concentrations (CX) and professional masters (MX) that are designed to be multidisciplinary with a focus on the digital economy and emerging fields. All academic programs are offered with a digital foundation and recently there were introduced 38 undergraduate concentrations (CX), 32 one-year master's degrees, and 20 interdisciplinary research centers.

Innovative learning
The 35 undergraduate degrees were revised to meet the demands of the job market by including the study of modern programming languages, data science, big data analysis, artificial intelligence, machine learning, business, and entrepreneurship. Every discipline starts with Artificial Intelligence (AI) and then branches into specific fields. This prepares the students with a common language heavily based on Artificial Intelligence satisfying the needs of highly skilled work requirements in this discipline.

Additionally, KFUPM is launching an effort to migrate some of its courses into more modern instructional methods, such as inquiry-based learning (IBL), where research on the topics is encouraged to enhance the class time with discussions, debates, and questions and answers. This will transform the academic delivery from classical lecturing, which can lead to minimal retention by students, into more student engagement and participation during class.

To prepare students to make meaningful contributions and to tackle the challenges of society, KFUPM's 38 undergraduate concentrations (CX) where the students not only earn a major in a certain discipline but can choose to add a degree of specialization in an area of their interest. Some of the concentrations offered are in high demand and have been very well received by the industry through several sponsorships. A few examples of these concentrations are Hydrogen Mobility, Renewable Energy and Energy Storage, Artificial Intelligence and Machine Learning, Business Analytics, Robotics and Autonomous Systems, just to name a few.

KFUPM offers 32 one-year professional master's degrees (MX) to better prepare the professional segment of the economy in a variety of fields like Artificial Intelligence, Supply Chain Management, Quantum Computing, Smart and Sustainable Cities, etc. These one-year programs provide valuable professional development skills to professionals and entrepreneurs already working in the industry to make significant contributions to the advancement, effectiveness, and productivity of their organizations.

Admissions
KFUPM is a merit-based admissions academic institution. It is one of the most coveted universities in Saudi Arabia, recruiting roughly the top 2% of the national talent based on admission criteria that include performance on the nationwide aptitude tests to ensure the acceptance of the most promising students.

The university has accelerated the admission process of female students since 2019 as both male and female students were equally accepted into the new master's degree programs for the first time in the university's history. Starting from 2021, KFUPM is opening admissions for female students at the undergraduate level for the 2021/2022 academic year, marking an important milestone in the university's history since until now it was an institution exclusively open to male students.

KFUPM is improving the quality of the student intake by attracting the most outstanding high school graduates by introducing an early admissions system and accepting winners in international scientific Olympiad competitions. The progression of students in the first year has been accelerated by developing programs to bypass the preparatory year (SkipPrep).

Rankings 

KFUPM was named the top university in the Arab Region as per the QS University Rankings for 2015 and 2016. In 2022 it was ranked the third university in the region.

Since the KFUPM transformation phase started in 2019, the university's rankings have seen a steady rise. According to the QS World University Rankings, KFUPM is placed among the top 200 universities in the world at the 163rd position.

Accreditation
All programs of the engineering colleges were evaluated for "Substantial-Equivalency" recognition by the Accreditation Board for Engineering and Technology (ABET). They were found substantially equivalent to similar accredited programs in the United States. All Business & Management related programs offered by KFUPM Business School (including its flagship Master of Business Administration are accredited by the Association to Advance Collegiate Schools of Business (AACSB). KFUPM is a member of AACSB since 1975 and it is among the first few schools outside the US to get this prestigious recognition. KFUPM is also accredited by the national accrediting body NCAAA.

Organization

Colleges
KFUPM undergraduate and graduate programs are divided into seven colleges. As part of the university's recent transformational initiatives, all colleges recently underwent a complete restructuring to encourage collaboration among disciplines, and encourage cross-discipline research.
College of Engineering and Physics
College of Computing and Mathematics
College of Petroleum Engineering and Geosciences
College of Chemicals and Materials
College of Design and Built Environment
KFUPM Business School
College of General Studies

In addition, Dammam Community College is under the auspices of King Fahd University of Petroleum and Minerals as a fully approved academic entity by the Minister of Higher Education.

Leadership
The current president of KFUPM is Muhammad M. Al-Saggaf.

Previous rectors (heads of institution) of KFUPM 
 Dr. Sahel N. Abduljauwad (acting)
 H.E. Dr. Khaled S. Al-Sultan
 H.E. Dr. Abdulaziz Al Dukhayyil
 H.E. Dr. Bakr Bin Bakr
 Dr. Saleh Ambah

King Fahd University of Petroleum & Minerals organized the international advisory board (IAB) in March 2007. The IAB is composed of senior academic and corporate executives.

IAB members 

Martin C. Jischke: Chairman international advisory board, president emeritus, Purdue University, Indiana, United States
Khalid A. Al-Falih: Vice chairman International Advisory Board, chief executive officer, Saudi Arabian Oil Company (Saudi Aramco), Saudi Arabia
Khaled S. Al-Sultan: Ex-Rector of KFUPM and president of King Abdullah City for Atomic and Renewable Energy
Andrew Gould: chairman and chief executive officer, Schlumberger Limited, U.S.
Shih Choon Fong: president of King Abdullah University of Science and Technology, Thuwal, Saudi Arabia; former president of the National University of Singapore, Singapore
Mohamed Al-Mady: vice chairman and chief executive officer, Saudi Basic Industries Corporation, Saudi Arabia
John Etchemendy: provost of Stanford University, California, U.S.
Hugo F. Sonnenschein: president emeritus and Adam Smith Distinguished Service Professor, University of Chicago, Illinois, U.S.
John G. Rice: vice chairman, General Electric and president and chief executive officer of GE Technology Infrastructure, U.S.
Charles Elachi: director of NASA's Jet Propulsion Laboratory (JPL), located in Pasadena, California.
Olivier Appert: chairman and chief executive officer Institut Francais du Petrole (IFP), France
Nam Pyo Suh: president of Korea Advanced Institute of Science and Technology (KAIST), South Korea
Wolfgang A. Herrmann: president, Technical University of Munich (TUM), Germany
Henry Rosovsky: Lewis P and Linda L Geyser University Professor, Emeritus at Harvard University, Massachusetts, U.S.
Samir A. Al Baiyat: Secretary of International Advisory Board, and manager of Research & Innovation Support at KFUPM

King Abdullah bin Abdulaziz Science Park
Generally referred to as the KASP, the science park was established in 2002 and is located on a 35-hectare site north of the KFUPM campus. The park is closely integrated with the university. With its proximity to the science and engineering colleges, KASP provides interaction between tenant firms and their personnel and university scientists and engineers. At present, Schlumberger, Ciba, Yokogawa, Honeywell, UOP, Baker Hughes and JCCP have joined the park.

AMAAD Business Park
AMAAD is a mega real estate investment project of KFUPM Endowment and it converges the resources and experiences of the most prominent establishments in the kingdom to foster innovation through an energy and engineering hub spread across an area of 214,000 sqm in Dhahran. The park is designed to meet the demands of modern society that features a simple yet luxurious lifestyle for offices, residential, hospitality, as well as F&B and retail.

Consulting Services Center
The Consulting Services Center facilitate the consulting services for the university faculty to serve the industrial community in Saudi Arabia which contributes to their professional development and helps the outside community to resolve problems that require high intellectual and technological background.

Technology Business Incubator
The Technology Business Incubator provides a set of logistical, strategic, and operational support for start-up Saudi technology companies and entrepreneurs.

Liaison office
The Liaison Office is a point of contact with the industry/business.

Sultan bin AbdulAziz Science & Technology Center (SciTech)
The center is at the corniche of nearby Khobar city on 21,700 m2. The buildings area is 14,100 m2. It consists of seven main show halls, dealing with different sciences and technologies. There are more than 350 scientific exhibited pieces and the IMAX scientific dome, the Astronomic Observatory, Educational Unit, Conference Hall, Temporary Exhibitions Hall and Administrative and Services Facilities.

Research

Research innovation
The Research Institute (RI) has 16 research centers and is looking to expand into 20 centers in the coming year. Spanning engineering research, environment and water, refining and petrochemicals, communications and IT, economics, and management systems. KFUPM has introduced new inter-disciplinary research centers bringing together faculty members, researchers, and students in exciting topics such as advanced materials, intelligent manufacturing, robotics, security, smart mobility and logistics, hydrogen and energy storage. The Research Institute has produced hundreds of research reports for industrial and government sponsors. King Fahd university offers different scholarships for international students to support the needy students. These scholarships cover all tuition fee, living cost and monthly expenses along with other privilege's.

Dhahran Techno Valley

The Dhahran Techno Valley Holding Company (DTVC) is a subsidiary company fully owned by KFUPM. It was created to promote a knowledge-based economy in Dhahran and the Eastern Province. It is a hub for entrepreneurship and a launchpad for innovators from within and outside KFUPM. The ecosystem includes KFUPM and national companies like Saudi Aramco, SABIC, Saudi Electricity Company, technology partners, small to medium size companies, and multiple startups.

The mission of the Dhahran Techno Valley Holding Company is to foster an environment for innovation and collaboration by attracting and supporting industry players focused on creating innovative technologies and adding value to its stakeholders.

DTVC also plays an important part in revitalizing the role of entrepreneurship in the research system by rejuvenating and encouraging a spirit of developing new business opportunities for faculty, students, and stakeholders from outside the university.

University bodies

President
The president is the head of the institution and the university's chief academic and executive officer. The current president of KFUPM is Dr. Muhammad M. Al-Saggaf.

Previous presidents:
 Dr. Sahel N. Abduljauwad (acting)
 H.E. Dr. Khaled S. Al-Sultan
 H.E. Dr. Abdulaziz Al Dukhayyil
 H.E. Dr. Bakr Bin Bakr
 Dr. Saleh Ambah

International advisory board (IAB)
The international advisory board (IAB) of King Fahd University of Petroleum & Minerals provides KFUPM's senior management with a global perspective on trends and issues that may affect the university. Since its establishment in March 2007, the IAB membership has included renowned academics and some of the most influential local and international corporate figures. Dr. Martin Jischke, president emeritus of Purdue University, continues to serve as chairman of the board.

IAB members discuss a wide variety of topics related to the university and have been very effective in guiding the university's academic programs, research activities, faculty recruitment, outreach to peer institutions, and others. The IAB has guided the development of action plans and specific strategies on key educational and research areas of national interest.

Current IAB Members
 Martin C. Jischke: chairman international advisory board, president emeritus, Purdue University, Indiana, United States.
 Amin H. Nasser: vice-chairman international advisory board, president and CEO, Saudi Arabian Oil Company (Saudi Aramco), Saudi Arabia.
 Muhammad M. Al-Saggaf: president, King Fahd University of Petroleum and Minerals (KFUPM), Saudi Arabia.
 Charles Elachi: director of NASA's Jet Propulsion Laboratory (JPL), Pasadena, California.
 Abdulaziz Saleh Aljarbou: chairman, Saudi Basic Industries Corporation (SABIC), Saudi Arabia.
 Seifi Ghasemi: chairman, president, and CEO Air Products and Chemicals, United States.
 Paal Kibsgaard: CEO of Katerra Inc. Menlo Park, California.
 Suh Nam-pyo: president of Korea Advanced Institute of Science and Technology (KAIST), South Korea.
 Tony F. Chan: president of King Abdullah University of Science and Technology (Kaust), Saudi Arabia.
 Samir A. Al Baiyat: secretary-general of international advisory board, and director of the Office of International Cooperation, KFUPM, Saudi Arabia.

Former IAB Members
 Abdallah S. Jum'ah: former vice chairman of international advisory board, former president and CEO [Saudi Aramco], Saudi Arabia.
 Tony Meggs: former group vice president – technology British Petroleum Plc (BP), London, UK
 Kazuo Oike: former president of Kyoto University, Japan.
 David J. O’Reilly: chairman and chief executive officer, Chevron Corporation, U.S.
 G. Wayne Clough: secretary of the Smithsonian Institution, U.S.
 Shih Choon Fong: president of King Abdullah University of Science and Technology, Thuwal, Saudi Arabia; former president of the National University of Singapore, Singapore.
 Wolfgang A. Herrmann: president, Technical University of Munich (TUM), Germany.
 Henry Rosovsky: Lewis P. and Linda L. Geyser, professor emeritus at Harvard University, Massachusetts, United States.
 Robert J. Birgeneau: chancellor, University of California, Berkeley, United States.
 Andrew Gould: non-executive chairman of the board, BG Group Plc, UK
 John Etchemendy: provost of Stanford University, California, U.S.
 Khalid A. Al-Falih: chief executive officer of Saudi Arabian Oil Company (Saudi Aramco), Saudi Arabia.
 Mohamed Al-Mady: vice-chairman and chief executive officer, Saudi Basic Industries Corporation, Saudi Arabia.
 Olivier Appert: chairman and chief executive officer Institut Francais du Petrole (IFP), France.
 Joe Saddi: vice chairman, Booz & Company, U.S.
 Khaled S. Al-Sultan: ex-rector of KFUPM and president of King Abdullah City for Atomic and Renewable Energy (K.A.CARE).
 Yousef Abdullah Al-Benyan: vice-chairman and CEO, Saudi Basic Industries Corporation (SABIC), Saudi Arabia.
 Didier Houssin: chairman and CEO, IFP Energies Nouvelles (IFPEN), Paris, France
 George P. "Bud" Peterson: president, Georgia Institute of Technology, United States.
 John G. Rice: vice-chairman, General Electric and president and chief executive officer of GE Technology Infrastructure, United States.
 Jean-Lou Chameau: president, King Abdullah University of Science & Technology (KAUST), Saudi Arabia
 Hugo F. Sonnenschein: president emeritus and Adam Smith Distinguished Service Professor, University of Chicago, Illinois, United States.
 Khattab G. Al-Hinai: former secretary-general of international advisory board.
 Muhammad A. Al-Arfaj: former secretary-general of international advisory board.

Entrepreneurship
Since 2010, the mission of the Entrepreneurship Institute is to encourage and advance the development of an innovative and entrepreneurial ecosystem in the Kingdom of Saudi Arabia by providing education, training, and research. The institute also provides access to physical space and professional resources to students, faculty members, and entrepreneurs for the inception and growth of high potential startups.

Notable alumni

Government and public service
 Abdulaziz bin Salman, Minister of Energy (BSc and MBA, in industrial administration, '85)
 Abdullah Abdulrahman Almogbel, former minister of transport and mayor of Riyadh
 Abdulaziz bin Majid, former governor of Al Medina Al Monawwarah.
 Bandar bin Khalid Al Faisal, former chairman of Sama Airlines and member of Arab Thought Foundation Board of Trustees (BSc, Computer Science, '88)
 Saud bin Khalid Al Faisal, deputy governor of Saudi Arabian General Investment Authority and president of National Competitiveness Center(NCC) (BSc, Finance '01)
Ghazi Mashal Ajil al-Yawer, was President of Iraq under the Iraqi Interim Government after the 2003 invasion of Iraq.
 Fahd bin Abdul Rahman Balghunaim, former Saudi minister of agriculture (BSc, Civil Engineering, '75).
 Abdullatif bin Ahmed Al Othman, former governor of Saudi Arabian General Investment Authority and former senior vice president of finance Saudi Aramco (BSc, Civil Engineering, '79).
 Ahmed Alsuwaiyan, was appointed Governor and board member of the Digital Government Authority (DGA) in May 2021.

Academics
Khaled S. Al-Sultan: former Rector of KFUPM, former Dean of the college of Computer Systems and Engineering, former Chair of the Department of Systems Engineering at KFUPM, former professor of Optimization and Operations Research at the Department of Systems Engineering at KFUPM, former Assistant Minister of Higher Education in Saudi Arabia, KFUPM, (BSc and MSc, Systems Engineering, '87)
Zaghloul El-Naggar, a Muslim scholar and chairman of Committee of Scientific Notions in the Qur'an, Supreme Council of Islamic Affairs, Cairo, Egypt. El-Najjar worked as a professor of geology at KFUPM from 1979 to 1996
Ali Abdullah Al-Daffa, professor in field of History of Mathematics.

Oil and gas industry
Khalid A. Al-Falih, former Minister of Energy, Industry and Mineral Resources and former chairman and president and CEO of Saudi Aramco, earned M.B.A.in 1991.
Nadhmi Al-Nasr, former interim president of King Abdullah University of Science and Technology and Saudi Aramco Vice President of KAUST (BSc in Chemical Engineering '79).
Omar Hussein (2007)

Sports and media
Yasser Al-Qahtani, Saudi Arabian footballer (drop-out)

See also

 List of things named after Saudi Kings

References

External links
 
 

 
Dhahran
Educational institutions established in 1963
Universities and colleges in Saudi Arabia
1963 establishments in Saudi Arabia
Energy education